This list of Russian women bandy champions shows the Russian national bandy champions for women's teams.

There was a Russian championship in the Russian Soviet Federative Socialist Republic in 1952-1954, but this was then discontinued. A team representing Moscow Oblast won it all these three years. In 1987, an RSFSR championship was arranged again and has been held annually since then. In the 1990/91 and 1991/92 seasons, the Russian championship was replaced by one for the entire Soviet Union, but since this union was dissolved midway through the latter season, the championship has then been for the Russian Federation since the 1992/93 season.

Women champions
Bandy in the Soviet Union
Russia women